ARA Buenos Aires was the lead ship of her class of destroyer built for the Argentine Navy, in service from 1938 to 1971.

Design 
The ship's design was based on the British Royal Navy's G class destroyer.

The Argentine Navy initially classified it as a "torpedo boat" ( torpedero), and in the 1950s as a "destroyer".

History 

Buenos Aires was laid down by Vickers Armstrong at Barrow and launched on 21 September 1937. After completion on 4 April 1938, she was turned over to the Argentine Navy, and remained in service until she was stricken in 1971.

It was the fifteenth ship of the Argentine Navy with this name.

References

Notes

Bibliography

Online sources

See also 
 List of ships of the Argentine Navy

Further reading

External links 
  

Buenos Aires-class destroyers
Ships built in Barrow-in-Furness
1937 ships
World War II destroyers of Argentina